The Norfolk Street station is an open-cut station on the Newark City Subway Line of the Newark Light Rail, and the first following the line leaving the Raymond Boulevard tunnel. It is located on Norfolk Street just south of Central Avenue in University Heights.

History
Norfolk Street station was originally built by Public Service Corporation of New Jersey on May 26, 1935, and contained a connection to the Central Avenue line until December 14, 1947 when the route was converted into bus route #23.

Vicinity
Institutions near the station include Science Park High School, the New Jersey Institute of Technology, the New Jersey Medical School, the New Jersey Dental School, the Graduate School of Biomedical Sciences, the School of Health Related Professions, and the School of Nursing. The historic, and now abandoned, Essex County Jail is adjacent to the station.

References

External links

 Norfolk Street entrance from Google Maps Street View
 Newark Street entrance from Google Maps Street View

Newark Light Rail stations
Railway stations in the United States opened in 1935